Cabourg is a commune in the Calvados department, region of Normandy, France. Cabourg is on the coast of the English Channel, at the mouth of the river Dives. The back country is a plain, favourable to the culture of cereal. The town sits on the Côte Fleurie (Flowery Coast) and its population increases by over 40,000 during the summer.

Geography 
Cabourg is located between Caen and Deauville, part of the Côte Fleurie. The town is on the Dives river, across from Dives-sur-Mer.

On 1 January 2017, the town was transferred from the Arrondissement of Caen to that of Lisieux.

Climate 
Cabourg has an Oceanic climate with mild summers and cool winters. The proximity of the sea limits large variations in temperature and creates winters without much frost and summers without excessive heat. Wind is frequent.

History
It was from Cabourg that William the Conqueror drove the troops of Henry I of France back into the sea in 1058.

According to Marcel Proust's biographer George D. Painter:

Population

Culture
Each year in June, Cabourg hosts the International Festival of the Romantic Movie.

Personalities 

Cabourg is famous for being Marcel Proust's favorite vacation place at the beginning of the 20th century; it is the inspiration for Balbec, the seaside resort in Proust's In Search of Lost Time.
 
  (1884, Avesnes-sur-Helpe1954)
 Sandrine Bonnaire
 Bruno Coquatrix (1910, Ronchin1979)
 Jean-François Dubos
 
 Adolphe d'Ennery (18111899)
 Jean-Louis Ezine (1948, Cabourg)
 Philippe Fourastié
 
 
 
 Corinne Lepage
 Charles-Gaston Levadé (1869–1948),
 Cecil Michaelis
 René-Xavier Prinet (1861, Vitry-le-François1946)
  (1851, Ajaccio1939)
 Paul Giroud (French physician, summer residence)

International relations 
Cabourg has relations with the following cities: 
 Atlantic City, USA
 Bad Homburg, Germany
 Bromont, Canada
 Chur, Switzerland
 Jūrmala, Latvia
 Mayrhofen, Austria
 Mondorf-les-Bains, Luxembourg
 Oussouye, Senegal
 Salcombe, United Kingdom
 Spa, Belgium
 Terracina, Italy

Popular culture 
 The Cabourg area, including the small hamlet of Varaville, is the setting for some of the events in the novel Villa Normandie (Endeavour Press, 2015) by Kevin Doherty.

References

External links 

  
 Cabourg website 

Communes of Calvados (department)
Seaside resorts in France